Blandine Ebinger (born Blandine Loeser) (4 November 1899, in Berlin – 25 December 1993, in Berlin) was a German actress and chansonniere.

Career 
Ebinger became acquainted with Friedrich Hollaender in 1919, and with him she became heavily invested as a performer, writer, and composer in the Berlin cabaret scene in the 1920s, beginning in the cabaret  and the Café des Westens. She recorded many of her husband's, Friedrich Hollaender, cabaret songs, including the set of songs entitled .  Ebinger emigrated to the United States in 1937, returning to Berlin in 1947. She moved to Munich, where she met her second husband, the publisher Helwig Hassepflug, in 1961. They eventually settled back in Berlin, where she continued her career in the theater and as an actress on television productions.

Family 
Ebinger was the daughter of the pianist Gustav Loeser and the actress Margarete Wezel. She married Friedrich Hollaender. Although Ebinger and Hollaender ended their marriage before Hollaender emigrated to the United States because of the increasingly hostile environment for Jewish citizens in the early 1930s, Ebinger nevertheless faced discrimination as a result of the marriage, much of which was directed at their half-Jewish daughter, Philine, who was briefly married to Georg Kreisler.

Death 
Ebinger died on 25 December 1993 in Berlin and is buried on the Waldfriedhof Dahlem. She was 94 years old.

Selected filmography

 The Dagger of Malaya (1919)
 Baccarat (1919)
 Prince Cuckoo (1919)
 The Rats (1921)
 Peter Voss, Thief of Millions (1921)
 She and the Three (1922)
 Between Evening and Morning (1923)
 The Flower Girl of Potsdam Square (1925)
 The Woman without Money (1925)
 We'll Meet Again in the Heimat (1926)
 Heads Up, Charley (1927)
 Violantha (1928)
 The Beautiful Adventure (1932)
 Contest (1932)
 Gitta Discovers Her Heart (1932)
 Little Man, What Now? (1933)
 Song of the Black Mountains (1933)
 Love Conquers All (1934)
 What Am I Without You (1934)
 Fresh Wind from Canada (1935)
 Girls in White (1936)
 The Beaver Coat (1937)
 Five Suspects (1950)
 The Staircase (1950)
 The Mosquito (1954)
 The Perfect Couple (1954)
 As Long as There Are Pretty Girls (1955)
 My Children and I (1955)
 Father's Day (1955)
 The First Day of Spring (1956)
 Every Day Isn't Sunday (1959)
 The Last Pedestrian (1960)
 Love Has to Be Learned (1963)

Portrayals
Hitler: The Rise of Evil (2003), portrayed by Nicole Marischka

References

External links
 
 Blandine Ebinger at filmportal.de
 
 Photos of Blandine Ebinger
 Blandines Leben
 

1899 births
1993 deaths
Actresses from Berlin
German stage actresses
German film actresses
German silent film actresses
Officers Crosses of the Order of Merit of the Federal Republic of Germany
20th-century German actresses

20th-century German women singers